Carl Voscherau (1900–1963) was a German film actor. He was also a prominent voice actor, dubbing foreign films for release in Germany. His son Henning Voscherau was Mayor of Hamburg.

Selected filmography
 Film Without a Title (1948)
 The Original Sin (1948)
 Blocked Signals (1948)
 I'll Never Forget That Night (1949)
 Artists' Blood (1949)
 Dangerous Guests (1949)
 Second Hand Destiny (1949)
 My Wife's Friends (1949)
 Only One Night (1950)
  The Girl from the South Seas (1950)
  The Man in Search of Himself (1950)
 Third from the Right (1950)
 Shadows in the Night (1950)
 You Have to be Beautiful (1951)
 Under the Thousand Lanterns (1952)
 Shooting Stars (1952)
 The Thief of Bagdad (1952)
 The Flower of Hawaii (1953)
 Under the Stars of Capri (1953)
 Come Back (1953)
 Not Afraid of Big Animals (1953)
 The Mosquito (1954)
 Two Blue Eyes (1955)
 How Do I Become a Film Star? (1955)
 Operation Sleeping Bag (1955)
 The Marriage of Doctor Danwitz (1956)
 The Heart of St. Pauli (1957)
 The Muzzle (1958)
 The Man Who Couldn't Say No (1958)
 The Blue Moth (1959)
 Freddy, the Guitar and the Sea (1959)
 The Night Before the Premiere (1959)

References

Bibliography
 Shandley, Robert. Rubble Films: German Cinema in the Shadow of the Third Reich. Temple University Press, 2010.

External links

1900 births
1963 deaths
German male film actors
Male actors from Hamburg